Huddersfield Town's 1981–82 campaign was a disappointing season for Town following nearly earning back-to-back promotions the previous season. Town only finished in 17th place. They did however have a fairly good season in the FA Cup, reaching the fourth round.

Squad at the start of the season

Review
Following the previous season's near miss, many fans were thinking that promotion would be just a formality for the season. The start, however, was very unsensational, with 4 draws and a loss in their first 5 league games. Their form did improve, but the season was mainly noted for the amount of career-ending injuries to Steve Kindon, Andy Rankin, Dick Taylor, Fred Robinson and Peter Fletcher. Even Steve Smith was called up for Town's FA Cup game against Workington.

Town's season seemed to be a battle against relegation back to Division 4, but results such as the thrashings of Reading by 6–1, Swindon Town by 5–1 and the 5–0 defeat of Bristol City, which seemed to guarantee Town's Division 3 status, near the end of May. Town finished with 57 points in the first season in which 3 points for a win was introduced, but a disappointing finishing position of 17th, would be a distant memory after next season's exploits.

Squad at the end of the season

Results

Division Three

FA Cup

Milk Cup

Appearances and goals

1981-82
English football clubs 1981–82 season